Benoy Kumar Sarkar (sometimes Binoy Kumar Sarkar) (1887–1949) was an Indian social scientist, professor, and nationalist.  He founded several institutes in Calcutta, including the Bengali Institute of Sociology, Bengali Asia Academy, Bengali Dante Society, and Bengali Institute of American Culture.

Early life and education 
Binoy Kumar Sarkar was born in Malda Town of Malda, West Bengal, in Bengal Presidency. He started his early education in Malda Zilla School. Sarkar entered the University of Calcutta at the age of 13 after standing first at the entrance examination from Malda Zilla School, while he graduated in 1905, at 18, with dual degrees in English and history. The following year he received his master's degree.

Career 
In 1925 Sarkar started as a lecturer at the Department of Economics of University of Calcutta. He praised Nazism as "form of benevolent dictatorship", and advocated the establishment of a fascist dictatorship in India. In 1947 he became a professor and head of the department.

Closely involved with the National education movement of India, Professor Sarkar was highly influenced by the Nationalist action of Sister Nivedita.

Selected publications
Sarkar wrote in five languages, his native Bengali, English, German, French and Italian, publishing a large volume of work on a variety of topics, including 53 books and booklets in English alone, his written production amounting in all to some 30 000 pages. A complete list of his publications is contained in Bandyopadhyay's book The Political Ideas of Benoy Kumar Sarkar.
 1914/1921 The Positive Background of Hindu Sociology
 1916 The beginning of Hindu culture as world-power (A.D. 300-600)
 1916 Chinese Religion Through Hindu Eyes
 1918 Hindu achievements in exact science a study in the history of scientific development
In 1919, he authored a study in the American Political Science Review presenting a "Hindu theory of international relations" which drew on thinkers such as Kautilya, Manu and Shookra, and the text of the Mahabharata. In 1921, he authored a Political Science Quarterly study presenting a "Hindu Theory of the State." According to Barry Buzan and Amitav Acharya, Sarkar's works "may be the first major IR contributions by an Indian, and one of the first modern efforts to develop an indigenous Non-Western theory of IR."

Death 
He died on a trip to the United States in Washington, DC, in November 1949.

Notes

References
Sen, Satadru (2015) "Benoy Kumar Sarkar. Restoring the nation to the world", Taylor and Francis: London. 
Behn, Wolfgang (2004) "Benoy Kumar Sarkar: 1887-1949" Concise Biographical Companion to Index Islamicus, 1665-1980: An international who's who in Islamic studies from its beginnings down to the twentieth century (Volume Three (N-Z)) Koninklijke Brill: Leiden, Netherlands. 
Sinha, Vineeta (2007) "Sarkar, Benoy Kumar (1887–1949)" in Ritzer, George (ed.) (2007) Blackwell Encyclopedia of Sociology Blackwell Publishing: Malden, MA. 
Sarkar, Ida (1977) "My life with Prof. Benoy Kumar Sarkar", compiled and translated from the German text by Indira Palit. Prabhat: Calcutta. (BEPI, 1994. The Natl. bibliogr. of Indian literature / gen. ed. B.S. Kesavan ; V.Y. Kulkarni, 1962, vol. I, p. 246. NUC pre-1956)

External links
Benoy Kumar Sarkar materials in the South Asian American Digital Archive (SAADA)
Online books by Benoy Kumar Sarkar in the University of Pennsylvania
 Benoy Kumar Sarkar, WorldCat catalogue

Indian sociologists
20th-century Indian social scientists
Indian social scientists
Indian political scientists
International relations scholars
University of Calcutta alumni
Academic staff of the University of Calcutta
1887 births
1949 deaths
Scientists from West Bengal
People from Malda district
Scholars from West Bengal
20th-century Indian male writers
Bengali Hindus
20th-century Bengalis
Bengali writers
West Bengal academics
20th-century political scientists